was a  of the Imperial Japanese Navy.

Design and description
The Yūgumo class was a repeat of the preceding  with minor improvements that increased their anti-aircraft capabilities. Their crew numbered 228 officers and enlisted men. The ships had two Kampon geared steam turbines, each driving one propeller shaft, using steam provided by three Kampon water-tube boilers.

The main armament of the Yūgumo class consisted of six Type 3  guns in three twin-gun turrets, one superfiring pair aft and one turret forward of the superstructure. The guns were able to elevate up to 75° to increase their ability against aircraft, but their slow rate of fire, slow traversing speed, and the lack of any sort of high-angle fire-control system meant that they were virtually useless as anti-aircraft guns. They were built with four Type 96  anti-aircraft guns in two twin-gun mounts, but more of these guns were added over the course of the war. The ships were also armed with eight  torpedo tubes in a two quadruple traversing mounts; one reload was carried for each tube. Their anti-submarine weapons comprised two depth charge throwers for which 36 depth charges were carried.

Construction and career
She was at the Battle of Leyte Gulf of 23–26 October 1944, assigned to the 1st Diversion Attack Force. On 23 October, she rescued 769 survivors of the cruiser . On 24 October, she assisted the torpedoed cruiser . The next day she suffered minor damage in a collision with the destroyer . On 26 October she rescued 328 survivors from the cruiser .

On 10 November 1944, Akishimo was escorting troop convoy TA No. 4 from Manila to Ormoc, Philippines. She suffered heavy damage in an air attack by U.S. Army B-25 Mitchells during the withdrawal; the ship took a direct bomb hit and lost her bow with 20 killed and 35 injured.

On 13 November, a U.S. air raid on Manila struck Akishimo, then alongside the destroyer  at Cavite pier. Direct bomb hits set both ships ablaze. The following day a large explosion on Akishimo further damaged both ships; Akishimo rolled over onto her starboard side. There were 170 survivors, 15 crewmen killed and 25 wounded.

References

Sources

External links
 CombinedFleet.com: Yugumo-class destroyers
 CombinedFleet.com: Akishimo history

Yūgumo-class destroyers
World War II destroyers of Japan
Destroyers sunk by aircraft
Shipwrecks in Manila Bay
World War II shipwrecks in the South China Sea
1943 ships
Maritime incidents in November 1944
Ships sunk by US aircraft
Naval magazine explosions
Ships built by Fujinagata Shipyards